Dubusia is a small genus of mountain tanagers found in South America.

Taxonomy and species list
The genus Dubusia was introduced in 1850 by the French naturalist Charles Lucien Bonaparte. The name was chosen to honor the Belgian politician and ornithologist Bernard du Bus de Gisignies. The type species was subsequently designated as the buff-breasted mountain tanager.

The genus contains two species:

References

 
Bird genera
Taxa named by Charles Lucien Bonaparte